Robert S. Bennett III (born 1939) is an American attorney and senior counsel to Bennett LoCicero & Liu LLP. He is best known for representing President Bill Clinton during the Clinton–Lewinsky scandal.

Early life and education 
Born in Brooklyn, New York, he graduated from Brooklyn Preparatory School in 1957. He received his B.A. from Georgetown University in 1961, where he was a member of the Philodemic Society, his LL.B. from Georgetown in 1964, and his LL.M from Harvard Law School in 1965.

Career 
From 1965 to 1967, he served as a clerk for Howard Francis Corcoran, a judge of the U.S. District Court for the District of Columbia. After graduating from law school, Bennett served as assistant U.S. attorney for the District of Columbia. He then went on to Hogan & Hartson, where he worked in the litigation department. He then became a partner with the firm Skadden in Washington, D.C. In September 2009, Bennett announced that he would be returning to Hogan & Hartson. On January 20, 2012 Bennett confirmed that he would represent Megaupload, but he withdrew two days later due to a conflict of interest with another client. He later founded and was a partner at Bennett Doyle, LLP. 

Bennett represented Judith Miller in the Plame affair grand jury investigation case, Caspar Weinberger during the Iran–Contra affair, Clark Clifford in the Bank of Credit and Commerce International (BCCI) scandal, and Paul Wolfowitz in the World Bank Scandal. He served as special counsel for the Senate Ethics Committee's 1989–1991 investigation of the Keating Five. In 2008, Bennett was hired by John McCain to defend allegations by The New York Times of an improper relationship with a Washington lobbyist. 

Bennett served as a member of the National Review Board for the Protection of Children & Young People, created by the United States Conference of Catholic Bishops, from 2002 to 2004. He is the older brother of William Bennett, former United States secretary of education and director of the Office of National Drug Control Policy. He is the author of In The Ring: The Trials of a Washington Lawyer, published in 2008.

Bennett is portrayed by Christopher McDonald in the 2021 miniseries Impeachment: American Crime Story.

References

External links 
 Eisler, Kim. "Robert Bennett Throws Punches, Tells Tales", Washingtonian, January 30, 2008.  
 Biography, with photo, on Hogan Lovells' site
 

1939 births
Living people
Date of birth missing (living people)
Georgetown University alumni
Harvard Law School alumni
Lawyers from Washington, D.C.
Brooklyn Preparatory School alumni
Lawyers from Brooklyn
Skadden, Arps, Slate, Meagher & Flom people
Georgetown University Law Center alumni
20th-century American lawyers
21st-century American lawyers
People associated with Hogan Lovells
Philodemic Society members